Long intergenic non-protein coding RNA 1137 is a protein that in humans is encoded by the LINC01137 gene.

References

Further reading 

Human proteins